Sally Stutsman (née Jackowell; November 27, 1946) was the Iowa State Representative from the 77th District. A Democrat, she has served in the Iowa House of Representatives since 2013.

References

1946 births
Living people
People from Fort Dodge, Iowa
Women state legislators in Iowa
Democratic Party members of the Iowa House of Representatives
21st-century American politicians
21st-century American women politicians